HMS Mallow was a  commissioned into the Royal Navy that served as a convoy escort during World War II; with the Royal Navy in 1940–1944, and with the Royal Yugoslav Navy-in-exile in 1944–1945. In Yugoslav service she was renamed Nada. Her main armament was a single  Mk IX naval gun, although a significant number of secondary and anti-aircraft guns were added towards the end of the war. During the war she escorted a total of 80 convoys whilst in British service, sinking one German U-boat, and escorted another 18 convoys whilst in Yugoslav service. After the war she served in the fledgling Yugoslav Navy as Nada then Partizanka, before being returned to the Royal Navy in 1949. Later that year she was transferred to the Egyptian Navy in which she served as El Sudan until she was decommissioned in 1975.

Design, description and construction
Many ships of the class were modified while they were under construction, or as the opportunity presented itself during service.

She had a crew of 85 men. She was powered using steam created by two cylindrical boilers, driving a single 4-cylinder triple-expansion steam engine that generated .

The ship was armed with a single  Mk IX naval gun, two depth charge throwers and two depth charge rails, and could carry 40 depth charges. Ships of the class were also initially equipped with one 2-pounder "pom-pom" autocannon and two twin  machine guns. Later in the war, they received two additional depth charge throwers and their capacity was increased to 70 depth charges. The machine guns proved inadequate as anti-aircraft (AA) weapons, and were replaced by heavier guns. In 1944, Mallows AA armament included a total of six single  Oerlikon cannons, and one 2-pounder "pom-pom". This was intended to better meet the higher air threat in the Mediterranean Sea. She was also equipped with rocket rails fitted to the gun shield of the 4-inch gun, a forward-firing anti-submarine Hedgehog fitted aft of the main gun, and had a Type 271 radar fitted on the rear of her bridge. By 1945, Mallows armament had been further enhanced with two 6-pounder Hotchkiss guns.

Mallow was built by the firm of Harland and Wolff at Belfast, Northern Ireland under as yard number 1065, and was ordered on 19 September 1939, laid down on 14 November, launched on 22 May 1940, and commissioned on 2 July. She was allocated the pennant number K81, and her first captain was Lieutenant Commander William Brown Piggott.

Career

Mallow was quickly put into service as a convoy escort from July 1940 onwards; her first convoy was OB 187 which departed Liverpool on 21 July. During the balance of 1940, she was engaged as an escort for 24 convoys as they left from or arrived at Liverpool. During 1941, she escorted 22 convoys to and from Liverpool, as well as three that departed from Milford Haven in Wales. On 1 July 1941, Lieutenant William Robert Boyce Noall took command of Mallow. In October 1941 she was serving with the 37th Escort Group based in Liverpool, along with two sloops and seven other corvettes. In mid-October, the group was assigned to escort Convoy HG 75 from Gibraltar to Liverpool; Mallow and the Shoreham-class sloop  participated in sweeps west of Gibraltar against the concentration of German U-boats awaiting the departure of the convoy, and together sank U-204 on the 19th. The convoy departed a week later than scheduled due to the submarine threat. On 26 October, Mallow assisted in driving away U-563 and U-564 from the same convoy. Noall was later made a Companion of the Distinguished Service Order for "skill and enterprise in dealing with submarines" whilst commanding Mallow.

During 1942, Mallow escorted 15 convoys, again mainly to and from Liverpool, and escorted the same number in 1943, remaining with the 37th Escort Group covering the UK–Mediterranean and UK–Sierra Leone convoy routes. On 10 May 1943, Temporary Acting Lieutenant Commander Harold Thomas Stewart Clouston assumed command of Mallow. In December 1943, Mallow was not listed as active on the Navy List.

In early 1944, Mallow was transferred to the Royal Yugoslav Navy-in-exile and renamed Nada. She sailed with a reduced crew in convoy OS 68/KMS 42 which departed Liverpool on 12 February and arrived at Gibraltar on 25 February. Nada then commenced escort duties in May, conducting a total of 17 convoy escorts between Gibraltar and Port Said, Egypt, to October. During her final escort of 1944, she was detached from convoy KMS 66 as her crew was not considered "politically reliable" because they were not aligned with Josip Broz Tito's Partisan forces. She is recorded as participating in one escort in early February 1945. After the conclusion of the war, Nada was taken over by the fledgling Yugoslav Navy and renamed Partizanka. In 1949, she was returned to the Royal Navy and reverted to HMS Mallow. The requirement to return Partizanka was a painful blow to the Yugoslavs, as she was one of few modern warships in service with them at the time. On 28 October 1949, Mallow was transferred to the Egyptian Navy where she served as El Sudan. By 1971 she was one of the last ships of her class in use. She remained in service until 1975, latterly in a training role, and was decommissioned in that year.

Footnotes

References
 
 
 
 
 
 
 
 
 
 
 
 
 
 
 
 
 
 
 

Flower-class corvettes of the Royal Navy
Ships of the Royal Yugoslav Navy
Ships of the Yugoslav Navy
Ships of the Egyptian Navy
World War II naval ships of Yugoslavia
1940 ships
Ships built in Belfast
Ships built by Harland and Wolff
Corvettes by navy
Corvettes of Egypt